The 1961 Pepperdine Waves football team represented George Pepperdine College as an independent during the 1961 NCAA College Division football season. The team was led by second-year head coach Pence Dacus. The Waves played home games at Sentinel Field on the campus of Inglewood High School in Inglewood, California. Pepperdine finished the season with a record of 1–9 for the second year in a row.

On December 20, 1961, Pepperdine announced that it was dropping its football team due to financial considerations. In its 16 years of existence, the Waves football team compiled an overall 64–79–2 record, for a .448 winning percentage.

Schedule

Notes

References

Pepperdine
Pepperdine Waves football seasons
Pepperdine Waves football